Seven Kilometers from Jerusalem or "7 Km da Gerusalemme" is a film about a Milanese ad exec having a midlife crisis who makes a pilgrimage to the Holy Land.

Cast 
  
 Luca Ward as Alessandro Forte
Eleonora Brigliadori as  Marta Piano
Rosalinda Celentano as  Sara
 Emanuela Rossi as  Ginevra Santi
 Alessandro Haber as  Angelo Profeti
Isa Barzizza as  Elvira Marenghi
 Alessandro Etrusco as Jesus
 Giovanna Nodari as  Francesca
 Alessandra Barzaghi as  Martina Marenghi
Monica Ward as  Irene Castelli
 Gianni Palladino as Giordano Bruni
 Tony Rucco as  Diomede
 Pino Farinotti as  Cesare Piano
Paolo Limiti as  Television Manager
 Elena Presti as  Fabrizia

See also 
 List of Italian films of 2007

References

External links
https://web.archive.org/web/20070424234043/http://it.movies.yahoo.com/7/7-km-da-gerusalemme/index-1223675.html Italian language website

2007 films
Italian drama films
Portrayals of Jesus in film
2000s Italian-language films
Films about religion
2000s Italian films